A cay is a small, low-elevation, sandy island on the surface of a coral reef.

Cay or CAY may also refer to:

Places
Cay (volcano), a volcano in the Andes mountains in Chile
Çay, a town and district in Turkey
 Cayman Islands, by IOC country code
 Cayenne – Félix Eboué Airport, by IATA airport code

Other uses
Cay (band), a British alternative rock band
The Cay, a novel by Theodore Taylor
Cayuga language, an Iroquoian language of Canada and the United States
Central Alaskan Yup'ik language, an Eskimo language of Alaska, United States
Chevra Ahavas Yisroel, a Jewish congregation in Brooklyn, New York, United States
 Histidine, by genetic code